Ahmed Alos (born April 3, 1994) is a Yemeni football striker who currently plays for Al-Wehda Aden.

International career
His international debut came in 2016, at an AFC Asian Cup qualification match against Maldives. He was selected as part of the Yemeni squad at the 2019 AFC Asian Cup.

References

External links 

Living people
1994 births
Yemeni footballers
Yemen international footballers
Al-Wehda SC (Aden) players
Association football forwards
Yemeni League players
2019 AFC Asian Cup players